Chahardangeh District is in Eslamshahr County, Tehran province, Iran. At the 2006 National Census, its population was 53,041 in 13,751 households. The following census in 2011 counted 57,805 people in 16,564 households. At the latest census in 2016, the district had 60,631 inhabitants in 18,781 households.

References 

Eslamshahr County

Districts of Tehran Province

Populated places in Tehran Province

Populated places in Eslamshahr County